was a town located in Saeki District, Hiroshima Prefecture, Japan.

On November 1, 2004, Okimi, along with the towns of Nōmi and Ōgaki (all from Saeki District), and the former town of Etajima (from Aki District), was merged to create the city of Etajima and no longer exists as an independent municipality.

As of 2003, the town had an estimated population of 3,849 and a density of 139.46 persons per km². The total area was 27.60 km².

External links
 Official website of Etajima 

Dissolved municipalities of Hiroshima Prefecture